Liberty Hill is an unincorporated community in Cumberland County, Illinois, United States.

References

Unincorporated communities in Cumberland County, Illinois
Unincorporated communities in Illinois